Ruth Munson is a former Republican member of the Illinois House of Representatives.

She is the founder and owner of EveryWare Inc., a software development firm in Elgin, and served on the Elgin city council. Her House committee assignments at the beginning of her tenure were the Appropriations—Human Services, Computer Technology, Health Care Availability & Access, Housing & Urban Development, and Tourism Committees.

Upon the death of Republican incumbent Douglas Hoeft, Munson was appointed by local Republican leaders to serve as a member of the Illinois House from the 43rd district. She was sworn in on December 30, 2002. The 43rd district, at the time, included parts of Elgin, Barrington Hills, Carpentersville, and East Dundee.

In the 2008 general election, Munson lost to Keith Farnham by a margin of 322 votes.

References

External links
Bills  Committees
Project Vote Smart - Representative Ruth Munson (IL) profile
Follow the Money - Ruth Munson
2006
2004 campaign contributions
GlassHouse Ruth Munson blog
Ruth Munson campaign website
Women's Voices Illinois women legislators

1958 births
Living people
American people of Armenian descent
People from Waukegan, Illinois
Northern Illinois University alumni
Businesspeople from Illinois
Women state legislators in Illinois
Illinois city council members
Republican Party members of the Illinois House of Representatives
21st-century American politicians
21st-century American women politicians
Women city councillors in Illinois